Keng-Bulung is a village in the Ysyk-Ata District of Chüy Region of Kyrgyzstan. Its population was 3,741 in 2021. It was established in 1921.

References

Populated places in Chüy Region